David Wilkes (born 10 March 1964 in Barnsley) is a former professional football midfielder who played for Barnsley, Carlisle United, Halifax Town, Stockport County, Frickley Athletic Guiseley A.F.C. and Bridlington Town A.F.C.

Playing career

Barnsley
Wilkes started his career with his hometown club Barnsley, but injury plagued his career there and he only made 17 appearances for them between 1981 and 1984, he also scored 2 goals in this time. Wilkes was sent out on loan in March 1983 to Halifax Town, he made 4 appearances before returning at the end of March.
Hong Kong Harps
Wilkes joined Harps in January 1984 Harps went on to get to the Hong Kong FA cup final losing on penalties after extra time to South China. Wilkes returned for one more season with Harps the following season before returning to the UK due to a ban on foreign players.
Stockport County
Wilkes joined County for one season but played few games due to a knee injury.
Wilkes played for three non league teams before joining Carlisle. Frickley Athletic. Guiseley FC and Bridlington Town.

Carlisle United
Wilkes joined Carlisle United in 1990 and played 5 games for them, he retired from playing to become the Carlisle youth team coach in 1992.

Coaching career

Carlisle United
After retiring in 1992, Wilkes joined Carlisle United as Youth Development Officer and then in 1995, under Mick Wadsworth, he stepped up to a senior coaching role, he also was caretaker manager when Mervyn Day left the club, in 1997.

Michael Knighton period
In 1997, then-Carlisle United chairman Michael Knighton refused to look for a new manager after Mervyn Day's departure, so he took over team selection and coaching. He was helped by John Halpin and Wilkes himself, who were both directors of coaching. During Carlisle's good spells Wilkes and Halpin were to take back seats and not to claim any credit but when things were going bad they were placed in the firing line by Knighton and endured criticism which they didn't really deserve.

Newcastle United
Around 1999, after leaving his post at Carlisle United, joined Newcastle United academy on the invitation of academy manager Alan Irvine.

Huddersfield Town
On 9 July 2002, Wilkes joined Mick Wadsworth at Huddersfield Town as First Team Coach. The season 2002–03 went awfully wrong for Huddersfield and at one point didn't record a win in 8 games. After a bad run of games in January 2003, Wadsworth was sacked but the club couldn't pay him out so he was reinstated but was sacked again in March 2003, although Wilkes stayed as First Team Coach under Caretaker-Manager Mel Machin he left in May 2003, along with Machin and goalkeeping-coach Dave Watson, when Huddersfield were placed into administration.

Carlisle United, Again
Wilkes re-joined sometime in 2005 as Centre of Excellence Head. As of 2019 he is still Head of the Centre of Excellence.

References

External links
 Webpage about his spell as Director of Coaching at Carlisle United

1964 births
Living people
English footballers
Barnsley F.C. players
Halifax Town A.F.C. players
Harps F.C. players
Stockport County F.C. players
Frickley Athletic F.C. players
Bridlington Town A.F.C. players
Carlisle United F.C. players
English Football League players
Carlisle United F.C. non-playing staff
Huddersfield Town A.F.C. non-playing staff
English football managers
Carlisle United F.C. managers
English Football League managers
Association football midfielders